Roger Jason Stone (born Roger Joseph Stone Jr.; August 27, 1952) is an American conservative political consultant and lobbyist.
Since the 1970s, Stone has worked on the campaigns of Republican politicians, including Richard Nixon, Ronald Reagan, Jack Kemp, Bob Dole, George W. Bush, and Donald Trump. In addition to frequently serving as a campaign adviser, Stone was a political lobbyist. In 1980, he co-founded a Washington, D.C.–based lobbying firm with Paul Manafort and Charles R. Black Jr. The firm recruited Peter G. Kelly and was renamed Black, Manafort, Stone and Kelly (BMSK) in 1984. 

During the 1980s, BMSK became a top lobbying firm by leveraging its White House connections to attract high-paying clients, including U.S. corporations and trade associations, as well as foreign governments. By 1990, it was one of the leading lobbyists for American companies and foreign organizations.

His personal style of achieving his clients’ goals have been described as, "a renowned infighter," "a seasoned practitioner of hard-edged politics," "a Republican strategist," and “a political fixer”. Stone has referred to himself as "an agent provocateur.". He has described his own political modus operandi as "Attack, attack, attacknever defend" and "Admit nothing, deny everything, and  launch a counterattack." 

Stone first suggested Trump run for president in early 1998 while he was Trump's casino business lobbyist in Washington. The Netflix documentary film Get Me Roger Stone focuses on Stone's past and his role in Trump's presidential campaign.

Stone officially left the Trump campaign on August 8, 2015. However, two unnamed associates of Stone have alleged that he collaborated with WikiLeaks founder Julian Assange during the 2016 presidential campaign to discredit Hillary Clinton. Stone and Assange have denied these claims. Nearly three dozen search warrants were unsealed in April 2020 which revealed contacts between Stone and Assange, and that Stone orchestrated hundreds of fake Facebook accounts and bloggers to run a political influence scheme on social media.

On January 25, 2019, Stone was arrested at his Fort Lauderdale, Florida, home in connection with Robert Mueller's Special Counsel investigation and charged in an indictment with witness tampering, obstructing an official proceeding, and five counts of making false statements. In November 2019, a jury convicted him on all seven felony counts. He was sentenced to 40 months in prison. On July 10, 2020, days before Stone was scheduled to report to prison, Trump commuted his sentence. On August 17, 2020, he dropped the appeal of his convictions. Trump pardoned Stone on December 23, 2020.

Early life and political work
Stone was born on August 27, 1952, in Norwalk, Connecticut, to Gloria Rose (Corbo) and Roger J. Stone. He grew up in the community of Vista, part of the town of Lewisboro, New York, on the Connecticut border. His mother was the president of Meadow Pond Elementary School PTA, a Cub Scout den mother, and occasionally a small-town reporter; his father "Chubby" (also Roger J. Stone) was a well driller and sometime chief of the Vista volunteer Fire Department. He has described his family as middle-class, blue-collar Catholics. His ancestry includes Hungarian and Italian.

Stone said that as an elementary school student during the 1960 presidential election, he broke into politics to further John F. Kennedy's presidential campaign: "I remember going through the cafeteria line and telling every kid that Nixon was in favor of school on Saturdays ... It was my first political trick."

When he was a junior and vice president of student government at John Jay High School in northern Westchester County, New York, he manipulated the ouster of the student government president and succeeded him. Stone recalled how he ran for election as president for his senior year: "I built alliances and put all my serious challengers on my ticket. Then I recruited the most unpopular guy in the school to run against me. You think that's mean? No, it's smart."

Given a copy of Barry Goldwater's The Conscience of a Conservative, Stone became drawn to conservatism as a child and a volunteer in Goldwater's 1964 campaign. In 2007, Stone indicated he was a staunch conservative but with libertarian leanings.

As a student at George Washington University in 1972, Stone invited Jeb Stuart Magruder to speak at a Young Republicans Club meeting, then asked Magruder for a job with Richard Nixon's Committee to Re-elect the President. Magruder agreed and Stone then left college to work for the committee.

Career

1970s: Nixon campaign, Watergate and Reagan 1976
Stone's political career began in earnest on the 1972 Nixon campaign, with activities such as contributing money to a possible rival of Nixon in the name of the Young Socialist Alliance and then slipping the receipt to the Manchester Union-Leader. Eventually Magruder and Herbert Porter hired Stone to spy on rival presidential campaigns during the 1972 Democratic Party presidential primaries. Stone subsequently hired Michael McMinoway to infiltrate campaigns of candidates such as Edmund Muskie and Hubert Humphrey. He also hired a spy in the Humphrey campaign who became Humphrey's driver. According to Stone, during the day he was officially a scheduler in the Nixon campaign, but "By night, I'm trafficking in the black arts. Nixon's people were obsessed with intelligence." Stone maintains he never did anything illegal during the Watergate scandal. The Richard Nixon Foundation later clarified that Stone had been a 20-year-old junior scheduler on the campaign, and that to characterize Stone as one of Nixon's aides or advisers was a "gross misstatement".

After Nixon won the 1972 presidential election, Stone worked for the administration in the Office of Economic Opportunity. After Nixon resigned, Stone went to work for Bob Dole, but was later fired after columnist Jack Anderson publicly identified Stone as a Nixon "dirty trickster".

In 1975, Stone helped found the National Conservative Political Action Committee, a New Right organization that helped to pioneer independent expenditure political advertising.

In the 1976 Republican Party presidential primaries, he worked in Ronald Reagan's campaign for U.S. President. In 1977, at age 24, Stone won the presidency of the Young Republicans in a campaign managed by his friend Paul Manafort; they had compiled a dossier on each of the 800 delegates that gathered, which they called "whip books".

1980s: Reagan 1980, lobbying, Bush 1988

Stone went on to serve as chief strategist for Thomas Kean's campaign for Governor of New Jersey in 1981 and for his reelection campaign in 1985.

Stone, the "keeper of the Nixon flame", was an adviser to the former President in his post-presidential years, serving as "Nixon's man in Washington". Stone was a protégé of former Connecticut Governor John Davis Lodge, who introduced the young Stone to former Vice President Nixon in 1967. After Stone was indicted in 2019, the Nixon Foundation released a statement distancing Stone's ties to Nixon. John Sears recruited Stone to work in Ronald Reagan's 1980 presidential campaign, coordinating the Northeast. Stone said that Roy Cohn helped him arrange for independent candidate John B. Anderson to get the nomination of the Liberal Party of New York, a move that would help split the opposition to Reagan in the state. Stone said Cohn gave him a suitcase that Stone avoided opening and that, as instructed by Cohn, he dropped off at the office of a lawyer influential in Liberal Party circles. Reagan carried the state with 46% of the vote. Speaking after the statute of limitations for bribery had expired, Stone later said, "I paid his law firm. Legal fees. I don't know what he did for the money, but whatever it was, the Liberal party reached its right conclusion out of a matter of principle."

In 1980, after their key roles in the Reagan campaign, Stone and Manafort decided to go into business together, with partner Charlie Black, creating a political consulting and lobbying firm to cash in on their relationships within the new administration. Black, Manafort & Stone (BMS), became one of Washington D.C.'s first mega-lobbying firms and was described as instrumental to the success of Ronald Reagan's 1984 campaign. Republican political strategist Lee Atwater joined the firm in 1985, after serving in the #2 position on Reagan-Bush 1984.

Because of BMS's willingness to represent brutal third-world dictators like Mobutu Sese Seko in Zaire and Ferdinand Marcos in the Philippines, the firm was branded "The Torturers' Lobby". BMS also represented a host of high-powered corporate clients, including Rupert Murdoch's News Corporation, The Tobacco Institute and, starting in the early 1980s, Donald Trump.

In 1987 and 1988, Stone served as senior adviser to Jack Kemp's presidential campaign, which was managed by consulting partner Charlie Black. In that same election, his other partners worked for George H. W. Bush (Lee Atwater as campaign manager, and Paul Manafort as director of operations in the fall campaign).

In April 1992, Time alleged that Stone was involved with the controversial Willie Horton advertisements to aid George H. W. Bush's 1988 presidential campaign, which were targeted against Democratic opponent Michael Dukakis. Stone has said that he urged Lee Atwater not to include Horton in the ad. Stone denied making or distributing the advertisement, and said it was Atwater's doing.

In the 1990s, Stone and Manafort sold their business. Although their careers went in different directions, their relationship remained close. Stone married his first wife Anne Elizabeth Wesche in 1974. Using the name Ann E.W. Stone, she founded the group Republicans for Choice in 1989. They divorced in 1990.

1990s: Early work with Donald Trump, Dole 1996
In 1995, Stone was the president of Republican Senator Arlen Specter's campaign for the 1996 Republican Party presidential primaries. Specter withdrew early in the campaign season with less than 2% support.

Stone was for many years a lobbyist for Donald Trump on behalf of his casino business and also was involved in opposing expanded casino gambling in New York State, a position that brought him into conflict with Governor George Pataki.

Stone resigned from a post as a consultant to the 1996 presidential campaign for Senator Bob Dole after The National Enquirer reported that Stone had placed ads and pictures on websites and swingers' publications seeking sexual partners for himself and Nydia Bertran Stone, his second wife. Stone initially denied the report. On the Good Morning America program he falsely stated, "An exhaustive investigation now indicates that a domestic employee, who I discharged for substance abuse on the second time that we learned that he had a drug problem, is the perpetrator who had access to my home, access to my computer, access to my password, access to my postage meter, access to my post-office box key." In a 2008 interview with The New Yorker, Stone admitted that the ads were authentic.

2000s: Florida recount, Killian memos, conflict with Eliot Spitzer
In the 2000 presidential election, Stone served as the campaign manager for Donald Trump's aborted campaign for President in the 2000 Reform Party presidential primaries. Investigative journalist Wayne Barrett accused Stone of persuading Trump to publicly consider a run for the Reform nomination to sideline Pat Buchanan and sabotage the Reform Party in an attempt to lower their vote total to benefit George W. Bush's campaign.

Later that year, according to Stone and the film Recount, Stone was recruited by James Baker to assist with public relations during the Florida recount. According to reporter Greg Palast, Stone was a key figure in organizing the so-called Brooks Brothers riot, the demonstration by Republican operatives against the recount.

In the 2002 New York gubernatorial election, Stone was associated with the campaign of businessman Thomas Golisano for governor of New York State.

During the 2004 presidential campaign, Stone was an advisor (apparently unpaid) to Al Sharpton, a candidate in the Democratic primaries. Defending Stone's involvement, Sharpton said, "I've been talking to Roger Stone for a long time. That doesn't mean that he's calling the shots for me. Don't forget that Bill Clinton was doing more than talking to Dick Morris." Critics suggested that Stone was only working with Sharpton as a way to undermine the Democratic Party's chances of winning the election. Sharpton denies that Stone had any influence over his campaign.

In that election a blogger accused Stone of responsibility for the Kerry–Specter campaign materials which were circulated in Pennsylvania. Such signs were considered controversial because they were seen as an effort to get Democrats who supported Kerry to vote for then Republican Senator Arlen Specter in heavily Democratic Philadelphia.

During the 2004 general election, Stone was accused by then-DNC Chairman Terry McAuliffe of forging the Killian memos that led CBS News to report that President Bush had not fulfilled his service obligations while enlisted in the Texas Air National Guard. McAuliffe cited a report in the New York Post in his accusations. For his part, Stone denied having forged the documents.

In 2007, Stone, a top adviser at the time to Joseph Bruno (the Majority Leader of the New York State Senate), was forced to resign by Bruno after allegations that Stone had threatened Bernard Spitzer, the then-83-year-old father of Democratic gubernatorial candidate Eliot Spitzer. On August 6, 2007, an expletive-laced message was left on the elder Spitzer's answering machine threatening to prosecute the elderly man if he did not implicate his son in wrongdoing. Bernard Spitzer hired a private detective agency that traced the call to the phone of Roger Stone's wife. Roger Stone denied leaving the message, despite the fact that his voice was recognized, claiming he was at a movie that was later shown not to have been screened that night. Stone was accused on an episode of Hardball with Chris Matthews on August 22, 2007, of being the voice on an expletive-laden voicemail threatening Bernard Spitzer, father of Eliot, with subpoenas. Donald Trump is quoted as saying of the incident, "They caught Roger red-handed, lying. What he did was ridiculous and stupid."

Stone consistently denied the reports. Thereafter, however, he resigned from his position as a consultant to the New York State Senate Republican Campaign Committee at Bruno's request.

In January 2008, Stone founded Citizens United Not Timid, an anti-Hillary Clinton 527 group with an intentionally obscene acronym.

Stone is featured in Boogie Man: The Lee Atwater Story, documentary on Lee Atwater made in 2008. He also was featured in Client 9: The Rise and Fall of Eliot Spitzer, the 2010 documentary of the Eliot Spitzer prostitution scandal.

Former Trump aide Sam Nunberg considers Stone his mentor during this time, and "surrogate father".

2010–2014: Libertarian Party involvement and other political activity
In February 2010, Stone became campaign manager for Kristin Davis, a madam linked with the Eliot Spitzer prostitution scandal, in her bid for the Libertarian Party nomination for governor of New York in the 2010 election. Stone said that the campaign "is not a hoax, a prank or a publicity stunt. I want to get her a half-million votes." However, he later was spotted at a campaign rally for Republican gubernatorial candidate Carl Paladino, of whom Stone has spoken favorably. Stone admittedly had been providing support and advice to both campaigns on the grounds that the two campaigns had different goals: Davis was seeking to gain permanent ballot access for her party, and Paladino was in the race to win (and was Stone's preferred candidate). As such, Stone did not believe he had a conflict of interest in supporting both candidates. While working for the Davis campaign, Warren Redlich, the Libertarian nominee for Governor, alleged that Stone collaborated with a group entitled "People for a Safer New York" to send a flyer labeling Redlich a "sexual predator" and "sick, twisted pervert" on the basis of a blog post Redlich had made in 2008. Redlich later sued Stone in a New York court for defamation over the flyers, and sought $20 million in damages. However, the jury in the case returned a verdict in favor of Stone in December 2017, finding that Redlich failed to prove Stone was involved with the flyers.

Stone volunteered as an unpaid adviser to comedian Steve Berke ("a libertarian member of his so-called After Party") in his 2011 campaign for mayor of Miami Beach, Florida in 2012. Berke lost the race to incumbent Mayor Matti Herrera Bower.

In February 2012, Stone said that he had changed his party affiliation from the Republican Party to the Libertarian Party. Stone predicted a "Libertarian moment" in 2016 and the end of the Republican party.

In June 2012, Stone said that he was running a super PAC in support of former New Mexico governor and Libertarian presidential candidate Gary Johnson, whom he had met at a Reason magazine Christmas party two years earlier. Stone told The Huffington Post that Johnson had a real role to play, although "I have no allusions  of him winning."

Stone considered running as a Libertarian candidate for governor of Florida in 2014, but in May 2013, he said in a statement that he would not run, and that he wanted to devote himself to campaigning in support of the 2014 Florida Amendment 2 referendum legalizing medical cannabis.

2015–2021: Donald Trump campaign and media commentary
Stone served as an adviser to the 2016 presidential campaign of Donald Trump. Stone left the campaign on August 8, 2015, amid controversy, with Stone claiming he quit and Trump claiming that Stone was fired. Despite this, Stone still supported Trump. A few days later, Stone wrote an op-ed called "The man who just resigned from Donald Trump's campaign explains how Trump can still win" for Business Insider.

Despite calling Stone a "stone-cold loser" in a 2008 interview and accusing him of seeking too much publicity in a statement shortly after Stone left the campaign, Donald Trump praised him during an appearance in December 2015 on Alex Jones' radio show that was orchestrated by Stone. "Roger's a good guy," Trump said. "He's been so loyal and so wonderful." Stone remained an informal adviser to and media surrogate for Trump throughout the campaign.

Stone had considered entering the 2016 United States Senate election in Florida to challenge white nationalist Augustus Invictus for the Libertarian nomination. He ultimately did not enter the race.

During the course of the 2016 campaign, Stone was banned from appearing on CNN and MSNBC after making a series of offensive Twitter posts disparaging television personalities. Stone specifically referred to the CNN commentator Ana Navarro as an "entitled diva bitch" and imagined her "killing herself", and called another CNN personality Roland Martin a "stupid negro" and a "fat negro". Erik Wemple, media writer for The Washington Post, described Stone's tweets as "nasty" and "bigoted". In February 2016, CNN said that it would no longer invite Stone to appear on its network, and MSNBC followed suit, confirming in April 2016, that Stone had also been banned from that network. In a June 2016 appearance on On Point, Stone told Tom Ashbrook: "I would have to admit that calling Roland Martin a 'fat negro' was a two-martini tweet, and I regret that. As for my criticism of Ana Navarro not being qualified ... I don't understand why she's there, given her lack of qualifications."

In March 2016, an article in the tabloid magazine National Enquirer stated that Ted Cruz, Trump's Republican primary rival, had extramarital affairs with five women. The article quoted Stone as saying, "These stories have been swirling about Cruz for some time. I believe where there is smoke there is fire." Cruz denied the allegations (calling it "garbage" and a "tabloid smear") and accused the Trump campaign, and Stone specifically, of planting the story as part of an orchestrated smear campaign against him. Cruz stated, "It is a story that quoted one source on the record, Roger Stone, Donald Trump's chief political adviser. And I would note that Mr. Stone is a man who has 50 years of dirty tricks behind him. He's a man for whom a term was coined for copulating with a rodent." In April 2016, Cruz again criticized Stone, saying on The Sean Hannity Show of Stone: "He is pulling the strings on Donald Trump. He planned the Trump campaign, and he is Trump's henchman and dirty trickster. And this pattern, Donald keeps associating himself with people who encourage violence." Stone responded by comparing Cruz to Richard Nixon and accusing him of being a liar.

In April 2016, Stone formed a pro-Trump activist group, Stop the Steal, and threatened "Days of Rage" if Republican party leaders tried to deny the nomination to Trump at the Republican National Convention in Cleveland. The Washington Post reported that Stone "is organizing [Trump] supporters as a force of intimidation", noting that Stone "has ... threatened to publicly disclose the hotel room numbers of delegates who work against Trump". Republican National Committee Chairman Reince Priebus said that Stone's threat to publicize the hotel room numbers of delegates was "just totally over the line".

After Trump had been criticized at the Democratic National Convention for his comments on Muslims by Khizr Khan, a Pakistani American whose son received a posthumous Bronze Star Medal and Purple Heart in Operation Iraqi Freedom in 2004, Stone made headlines defending Trump's criticism by accusing Khan of sympathizing with the enemy.

In 2017, Stone was the subject of a Netflix documentary film, titled Get Me Roger Stone, which focuses on his past and on his role in the 2016 presidential campaign of Donald Trump. Stone first suggested Trump run for President in early 1998 while Stone was Trump's casino business lobbyist in Washington.

Stone called Saudi Arabia "an enemy" and criticized Trump's visit to Riyadh in May 2017. He suggested that the Saudi government or members of the Saudi royal family directly supported or financed the September 11 attacks, tweeting that "Instead of meeting with the Saudis @realDonaldTrump should be demanding they pay for the attack on America on 9/11 which they financed."

During the campaign, Stone frequently promoted conspiracy theories, including the false claim that Clinton aide Huma Abedin was connected to the Muslim Brotherhood. In December 2018, as part of a defamation settlement, Stone agreed to retract a false claim he had made during the campaign: that Guo Wengui had donated to Hillary Clinton.

On September 10, 2020, Stone told InfoWars Alex Jones that, if Trump appeared to lose the 2020 United States presidential election, he should consider declaring martial law via the Insurrection Act and confiscate ballots, particularly in Nevada, where they were "completely corrupted" and so "should be seized by federal marshals." Further, Stone advised that the president invoke federal law to arrest the leading businessmen Tim Cook and Mark Zuckerberg as well as the politicians Bill and Hillary Clinton for "illegal activity" and shut down the opinion website The Daily Beast, arresting its staff for "seditious" activities; "this is war," announced Stone.

As numerous false and unsubstantiated allegations of voting fraud spread after the 2020 presidential election, Stone asserted he had "learned of absolute incontrovertible evidence of North Korean boats delivering ballots through a harbor in Maine." Matthew Dunlap, the Maine secretary of state, said the "vague rumor has absolutely no validity." In an 2020 interview with Tucker Carlson Tonight Stone also called Trump "the greatest president since Abraham Lincoln."

Stone has repeatedly indicated he would back Trump if he decided to run for a second non-consecutive term in the 2024 United States presidential election, and criticized Ron DeSantis for "disloyalty" amid rumors that he would run his presidential campaign.

Stone supported Russia during its 2022 invasion of Ukraine, claiming that Vladimir Putin was "acting defensively" in order to halt a purported U.S.-funded biological weapons program, which, in fact, did not exist.

2022: Ontario, Canada political organizing
On April 25, 2022, the Ontario Party announced that Stone had joined their campaign team as a Senior Strategic Advisor for the 2022 Ontario general election. According to the media release issued by the Ontario Party, Stone had previously joined party leader Derek Sloan to address the party's candidate convention and criticized Ontario Premier Doug Ford's approach to conservatism.

Proud Boys ties

In early 2018, ahead of an appearance at the annual Republican Dorchester Conference in Salem, Oregon, Stone sought out the Proud Boys, a radical right group known for street violence, to act as his "security" for the event; photos posted online showed Stone drinking with several Proud Boys. After his arraignment at the Miami federal courthouse in January 2019, they joined him on its steps holding signs that said, "Roger Stone is innocent," and promoting right-wing conspiracy theorist Alex Jones and his InfoWars website. Proud Boys founder Gavin McInnes said Stone was "one of the three approved media figures allowed to speak" about the group. When Stone was asked by a local reporter about the Proud Boys' claim that he had been initiated as a member of the group, he responded by calling the reporter a member of the Communist Party. He is particularly close to the group's current leader, Enrique Tarrio, who has commercially monetized his position. At a televised Trump rally in Miami, Florida, on February 18, 2019, Tarrio was seated directly behind President Trump wearing a "Roger Stone did nothing wrong" tee shirt.

The Washington Post reported in February 2021 that the FBI was investigating any role Stone might have had in influencing the Proud Boys and Oath Keepers in their participation in the 2021 storming of the United States Capitol.

Relations with Israel before the 2016 United States elections
According to The Times of Israel, Roger Stone "was in contact with one or more apparently well-connected Israelis at the height of the 2016 US presidential campaign, one of whom warned Stone that Trump was "going to be defeated unless we intervene" and promised "we have critical intell[sic]." The exchange between Stone and this Jerusalem-based contact appears in FBI documents made public".

Relations with Wikileaks and Russia before the 2016 United States elections

During the 2016 campaign, Stone was accused by Hillary Clinton 2016 presidential campaign chairman John Podesta of having prior knowledge of the publishing by WikiLeaks of Podesta's private emails obtained by a hacker. Stone tweeted before the leak, "It will soon  the Podesta's time in the barrel". Five days before the leak, Stone tweeted, "Wednesday Hillary Clinton is done. #Wikileaks." Stone has denied having any advance knowledge of the Podesta email hack or any connection to Russian intelligence, stating that his earlier tweet was referring to reports of the Podesta Group's own ties to Russia. In his opening statement before the United States House Permanent Select Committee on Intelligence on September 26, 2017, Stone reiterated this claim: "Note that my tweet of August 21, 2016, makes no mention, whatsoever, of Mr. Podesta's email, but does accurately predict that the Podesta brothers' business activities in Russia ... would come under public scrutiny."

Stone repeatedly acknowledged that he had established a back-channel with the WikiLeaks founder Julian Assange to obtain information on Hillary Clinton and pointed to this intermediary as the source for his advance knowledge about the release of Podesta's e-mails by WikiLeaks. Stone ultimately named Randy Credico, who had interviewed both Assange and Stone for a radio show, as his intermediary with Assange. A January 2019 indictment claimed Stone communicated with additional contacts knowledgeable about WikiLeaks plans.

In February 2017, The New York Times reported that as part of its investigation into the Trump campaign, the FBI was looking into any contacts Stone may have had with Russian operatives. The following month The Washington Times reported that Stone had direct-messaged alleged DNC hacker Guccifer 2.0 on Twitter. Stone acknowledged contacts with the mysterious persona and made public excerpts of the messages. Stone said the messages were just innocent praise of the hacking. U.S. intelligence agencies believe Guccifer 2.0 to be a persona created by Russian intelligence to obscure its role in the DNC hack. The Guccifer 2.0 persona was ultimately linked with an IP address associated with the Russian intelligence agency, GRU, in Moscow when a user with a Moscow IP address logged into one of the Guccifer social media accounts without using a VPN.

In March 2017, the Senate Intelligence Committee asked Stone to preserve all documents related to any Russian contacts. The Committee Vice Chair, Senator Mark Warner (D-VA), called on Stone to testify before the committee, saying he "hit the trifecta" of shady dealings with Russia. Stone denied any wrongdoing in an interview on Real Time with Bill Maher on March 31, 2017, and said he was willing to testify before the committee. The Committee's final report of August 2020 found that Stone did have access to Wikileaks and that Trump had spoken to Stone and other associates about it multiple times. Immediately after the Access Hollywood tape was released in October 2016, Stone directed his associate Jerome Corsi to tell Julian Assange to "drop the Podesta emails immediately," which Wikileaks leaked minutes later. However the drop had been announced three days previously and the Mueller investigation was only able to establish Corsi talked to Ted Malloch who was not an Assange associate. The Committee also found that Wikileaks "very likely knew it was assisting a Russian intelligence influence effort." In written responses to the Mueller investigation, Trump had stated he did not recall such discussions with Stone.

On September 26, 2017, Stone testified before the House Intelligence Committee behind closed doors. He also provided a statement to the Committee and the press. The Washington Post annotated Stone's statement by noting his affiliations with InfoWars, Breitbart, and Barack Obama citizenship conspiracy theories promulgator, Jerome Corsi. Stone also made personal attacks on Democratic committee members Adam Schiff, Eric Swalwell and Dennis Heck.

On October 28, 2017, following a news report by CNN that indictments would be announced within a few days, Stone's Twitter account was suspended by Twitter for what it called "targeted abuse" of various CNN personnel in a series of derogatory, threatening and obscenity-filled tweets.

On December 1, 2017, Stone texted Randy Credico, a prosecution witness: "If you testify you're a fool. Because of tromp (sic), I could never get away with a certain (sic) my Fifth Amendment rights but you can. I guarantee you you (sic) are the one who gets indicted for perjury if you're stupid enough to testify." According to his indictment, page 20, on April 9, 2018, Stone emailed these threats to the witness, including a comment regarding his security dog that he would: "...take that dog away from you," "You are a rat. A stoolie. You backstab your friends-run your mouth my lawyers are dying Rip you to shreds." "I am so ready. Let's get it on. Prepare to die cock sucker." In a May 21, 2018, email, Stone wrote: "You are so full of shit. You got nothing. Keep running your mouth and I'll file a bar complaint against your friend."

In a December 2017 interview with the Florida television station WBBH-TV, following the sentencing of Michael Cohen, Stone said that Cohen shouldn't have lied under oath, and Cohen was a "rat" because he turned on the president, something that Stone said he would never do.

On March 13, 2018, two sources close to Stone, former Trump aide Sam Nunberg and a person speaking on condition of anonymity, acknowledged to The Washington Post that Stone had established contact with WikiLeaks owner Julian Assange and that the two had a telephone conversation discussing emails related to the Clinton campaign which had been leaked to WikiLeaks. According to Nunberg, who claimed he spoke to the paper after being asked to do so by Special Counsel Robert Mueller, Stone joked to him that he had taken a trip to London to personally meet with Assange, but declined to do so, had only wanted to have telephone conversations to remain undetected and did not have advance notice of the leaked emails. The other source, who spoke on anonymity, stated that the conversation occurred before it was publicly known that hackers had obtained the emails of Podesta and of the Democratic National Committee, documents that WikiLeaks released in July and October 2016. Stone afterwards denied that he had contacted Assange or had known in advance about the leaked emails.

In May 2018, Stone's social media consultant, Jason Sullivan, was issued grand jury subpoenas from the Special Counsel investigation.

On July 3, 2018, U.S. District Judge Ellen Huvelle dismissed a lawsuit brought by political activist group Protect Democracy, alleging that Trump's campaign and Stone conspired with Russia and WikiLeaks to publish hacked Democratic National Committee emails during the 2016 presidential election race. The judge found that the suit was brought in the wrong jurisdiction. The next week, Stone was identified by two government officials as the anonymous person mentioned in the indictment released by Deputy Attorney General Rod Rosenstein that charged twelve Russian military intelligence officials with conspiring to interfere in the 2016 elections, as somebody the Russian hackers operating the online persona Guccifer 2.0 communicated with, and who the indictment alleged was in regular contact with senior members of the presidential campaign.

Charges

Arrest and indictment
On January 25, 2019, in a pre-dawn raid by 29 FBI agents acting on both an arrest warrant and a search warrant at his Fort Lauderdale, Florida, home, Stone was arrested on seven criminal charges of an indictment in the Mueller investigation: one count of obstructing an official proceeding, five counts of false statements, and one count of witness tampering. The same day, a federal magistrate judge released Stone on a US$250,000 signature bond and declared that he was not a flight risk. Stone said he would fight the charges, which he called politically motivated, and would refuse to "bear false witness" against Trump. He called Robert Mueller a "rogue prosecutor". In the charging document, prosecutors alleged that after the first WikiLeaks release of hacked DNC emails in July 2016, a senior Trump campaign official was directed to contact Stone about any additional releases and determine what other damaging information WikiLeaks had regarding the Clinton campaign. Stone thereafter told the Trump campaign about potential future releases of damaging material by WikiLeaks, the indictment alleged. The indictment also alleged that Stone had discussed WikiLeaks releases with multiple senior Trump campaign officials.

On February 18, 2019, Stone posted on Instagram a photo of the federal judge overseeing his case, Amy Berman Jackson, with what resembled rifle scope crosshairs next to her head. Later that day, Stone filed an apology with the court. Jackson then imposed a full gag order on Stone, citing her belief that Stone would "pose a danger" to others without the order.

Trial and conviction
Stone's trial began on November 6, 2019, at the United States District Court for the District of Columbia. Randy Credico testified that Stone urged and threatened him to prevent him testifying to Congress. Stone had testified to Congress that Credico was his WikiLeaks go-between, but prosecutors said this was a lie in order to protect Jerome Corsi. During the November 12 testimony, former Trump campaign deputy chairman Rick Gates testified that Stone told campaign associates in April 2016 of WikiLeaks' plans to release documents, far earlier than previously known. Gates also testified that Trump had spoken with Stone about the forthcoming releases. After a week-long trial and two days of deliberations, the jury convicted Stone on all counts – obstruction, making false statements, and witness tampering – on November 15, 2019. After the trial, one of the jurors emphasized that the jury did not convict Stone based on his political beliefs. On November 25, a decision denying a defense motion for acquittal was released. The judge wrote that the testimony of Steven Bannon and Rick Gates was sufficient to conclude that Stone lied to Congress.

Sentencing

Intervention by Trump and Justice Department officials
On February 10, 2020, prosecutors from the U.S. Attorney's Office for the District of Columbia requested that Stone be sentenced to seven to nine years in prison for his crimes after securing convictions on all seven charges. Around midnight, Trump characterized the sentencing recommendation as "horrible and very unfair situation" in tweeted, "Cannot allow this miscarriage of justice!" The next morning a senior Justice Department official said the department would recommend a lighter sentence, adding that the decision had been made before Trump commented. That afternoon the Department of Justice filed a revised sentencing memorandum, saying the initial recommendation could be "considered excessive and unwarranted under the circumstances." All four of the Assistant U.S. Attorneys who were prosecuting the case Jonathan Kravis, Aaron Zelinsky, Adam Jed and Michael Marando withdrew from the case, and Kravis resigned from the U.S. Attorney's Office altogether. Senate Minority Leader Chuck Schumer sent a letter to the Department of Justice Inspector General requesting a probe into the reduced sentencing recommendation, over fears of potential improper political interference in the process. Trump later said he had not asked the Justice Department to recommend a lighter sentence, but also asserted he had an "absolute right" to intervene. The next day he praised U.S. Attorney General William Barr for "taking charge" of the case and thanked Justice Department officials for recommending a lesser sentence than was proposed by the prosecutors who tried the case.

The politicization of Stone's sentencing by Trump and senior Trump administration officials at the Justice Department caused controversy and prompted allegations of political interference; the Justice Department's unusual decision to overrule the prosecutors on the case, as well as Stone's close association with Donald Trump, led to the affair being described as a crisis in the rule of law in the U.S. More than 2,000 former employees of the Department of Justice signed an open letter calling on Barr to resign, and the Federal Judges Association convened an emergency meeting on the matter. In testimony before the House Judiciary Committee, Zelinsky, one of the prosecutors who withdrew from the case after the Justice Department intervened to recommend a lighter sentence for Stone, said that the "highest levels" of Justice Department had been "exerting significant pressure" on prosecutors "to cut Stone a break" and "water down and in some cases outright distort" Stone's conduct. Zelinsky testified that "What I heardrepeatedlywas that Roger Stone was being treated differently from any other defendant because of his relationship to the president." Zelinsky also testified that acting U.S. Attorney Timothy Shea made the request for a lighter sentence for Stone after coming under "heavy pressure from the highest levels of the Department of Justice" and out of fear of Trump. Zelinsky testified that in his career as a prosecutor, United States v. Roger Stone was the sole occasion in which he witnessed "political influence play any role in prosecutorial decision making," and that he opted to resign from the case and his temporary appointment in the U.S. Attorney's Office in D.C. "rather than be associated with the Department of Justice's actions at sentencing. Former Attorney General Eric Holder tweeted, "do not underestimate the danger of this situation: the political appointees in the DOJ are involving themselves in an inappropriate way in cases involving political allies of the President"; former director of the Office of Government Ethics Walter Shaub tweeted, "a corrupt authoritarian and his henchmen are wielding the Justice Department as a shield for friends and a sword for political rivals. It is impossible to overstate the danger." Channing D. Phillips, who previously served as U.S. Attorney for D.C., said that the events were "deeply troubling" and that the withdrawal of all four line prosecutors suggested "undue meddling by higher ups at DOJ or elsewhere." CNN reported that other prosecutors in the U.S. Attorney's Office for D.C. had discussed resigning over the matter. The New York Times reported that federal prosecutors around the nation – already leery of taking cases that might catch Trump's attention – had become increasingly concerned after the Stone developments. In late June, Attorney General Barr agreed to testify before the House Judiciary Committee at an oversight hearing on July 28, 2020, which would be Barr's first congressional testimony since his confirmation in early 2019. Barr agreed to appear before the committee one day after Chairman Jerry Nadler said he would issue a subpoena to compel Barr's testimony if he did not appear voluntarily.

On February 11, 2020the same day the four Stone prosecutors withdrew from the case after the Justice Department intervened in the sentencing recommendationTrump withdrew the nomination of Jessie K. Liu, former U.S. Attorney for the District of Columbia, to become an Under Secretary of the Treasury, two days before her scheduled confirmation hearing. As U.S. attorney, Liu had overseen some ancillary cases referred by the Mueller investigation including the Stone prosecution, as well as a politically charged case involving former FBI deputy director Andrew McCabe, until attorney general Barr replaced her with his close advisor Shea in January 2020. CNN reported the next day that Liu's nomination was withdrawn because she was perceived to be insufficiently involved in the Stone and McCabe cases.

Post-trial motions and sentencing
On February 12, Judge Amy Berman Jackson denied Stone's motion for a new trial. Stone had asserted that a juror was biased against him. Stone again requested a new trial on February 14, after the jury foreperson of his trial publicly voiced support for the four prosecutors who withdrew from the Stone case. All jurors in the Stone trial had been vetted for potential bias by Judge Jackson, the defense team, and prosecutors.

On February 20, 2020, Judge Jackson sentenced Stone to 40 months in federal prison and a $20,000 fine for his crimes, but allowed him to delay the start of his sentence pending resolution of Stone's post-trial motions. Jackson stated in the sentencing hearing, "The truth still exists. The truth still matters [in spite of] Roger Stone's insistence that it doesn't [pose] a threat to our most fundamental institutions, to the very foundation of our democracy." Jackson also rejected Trump's attacks on the investigators and prosecutors, saying, "There was nothing unfair, phony, or disgraceful about the investigation or the prosecution." Jackson said "Roger Stone will not be sentenced for who his friends are, or who his enemies are."

On February 23, 2020, Judge Jackson rejected a request by Stone's lawyers that she be removed from the case.

On April 16, Judge Jackson denied Stone's motion for a new trial and ordered Stone to federal prison within 2 weeks.  On April 30, ABC News reported that they had learned through sources that the Federal Bureau of Prisons planned to delay Stone's surrender date by at least 30 days due to concerns relating to the COVID-19 pandemic. On May 28, Stone was ordered by Judge Jackson to report to prison by June 30. On June 24, Stone filed a motion to delay his transfer to prison, alleging potential health concerns connected to the COVID-19 pandemic. On June 27, Judge Jackson rescheduled Stone's surrender date as July 14, but also ordered him to immediately begin serving time in home confinement before reporting to prison.

Commutation and pardon
After Stone's conviction, Trump repeatedly indicated that he was considering a pardon for Stone. Trump also repeatedly attacked the prosecutors, judge, and jury in Stone's trial, and contended, without evidence, that the foreperson of the jury (which unanimously convicted Stone), was dishonest in the jury questionnaire, however she had previously made anti-Trump social media posts and had retweeted a social media post about Roger Stone's initial arrest shortly after it happened (before the trial). Another juror stated that had she not been there, they would have returned the same verdict but faster, insisting that the jury forewoman was impartial and focused on process. Stone publicly lobbied for clemency, stressing his loyalty to the president, saying: "He knows I was under enormous pressure to turn on him. It would have eased my situation considerably. But I didn't." Within Trump's circle, Fox News commentator Tucker Carlson, Trump aide Larry Kudlow, and Republican congressman Matt Gaetz urged Trump to grant clemency to Stone, as did Republican Senator Lindsey Graham. Carlson reportedly visited the white house and met with Jared Kushner to demand clemency for Stone.

Other Trump advisors, including chief of staff Mark Meadows, son-in-law and senior adviser Jared Kushner, and White House Counsel Pat A. Cipollone were concerned about granting clemency to Stone, viewing a grant of clemency as a political liability for Trump.

On July 10, 2020, Trump commuted Stone's sentence by entirely removing his jail time a few days before he was to report to prison. Trump personally called Stone to inform him that his sentence was being commuted. In a lengthy statement containing an array of grievances, Trump attacked the prosecutors as "overzealous" and said, "Roger Stone has already suffered greatly. He was treated very unfairly, as were many others in this case. Roger Stone is now a free man!" The Trump White House statement contained multiple statements and claims regarding Stone's prosecution and the Mueller investigation. The commutation was announced late on a Friday evening, a common time for the release of prospectively damaging news. Stone's commutation followed a number of occasions in which Trump granted executive clemency to his supporters or political allies, or following personal appeals or campaigns in conservative media, as in the cases of Rod Blagojevich, Michael Milken, Joe Arpaio, Dinesh D'Souza, and Clint Lorance, as well as Bernard Kerik. Trump's grant of clemency to Stone, however, marked "the first figure directly connected to the president's campaign to benefit from his clemency power." On July 15, 2020, counsel for two constitutional law professors sought leave of Judge Jackson to file an amicus brief addressing whether the commutation "may not be constitutionally valid". Judge Jackson denied their motion on July 30, saying that the matter was no longer in her court, so she lacked jurisdiction.

In rare public comments, prosecutor Robert Mueller forcefully rebutted Trump's claims in an op-ed in The Washington Post. Democrats condemned Trump's commutation of Stone's sentence, viewing it as abuse of the rule of law that distorted the U.S. justice system to protect Trump's friends and undermine Trump's rivals. Representatives Jerrold Nadler and Carolyn B. Maloney, who chair two House committees, said that "No other president has exercised the clemency power for such a patently personal and self-serving purpose" and said that they would investigate whether Stone's commutation was a reward for protecting Trump. Most Republican elected officials remained silent on Trump's commutation of Stone. Exceptions were Republican Senators Mitt Romney, who termed the commutation "unprecedented, historic corruption," and Pat Toomey, who called the commutation a "mistake" due in part to the severity of the crimes of which Stone was convicted.

On December 23, 2020, President Trump issued a full pardon to Stone.

2021 storming of the United States Capitol 

After Trump's November 2020 U.S. Presidential election loss, Stone urged followers to "fight until the bitter end". He appeared at the "Stop the Steal" rally on January 5, at Freedom Plaza, telling the crowd that the president's enemies sought "nothing less than the heist of the 2020 election and we say, No way!"  And "… we will win this fight or America will step off into a thousand years of darkness. We dare not fail. I will be with you tomorrow shoulder to shoulder."

The Washington Post reported that video footage showed Stone meeting with the Oath Keepers, a militia group indicted for seditious conspiracy for their role in the storming of the Capitol, on the day of the attack. In the weeks afterwards he pressured the Trump administration for a pardon of all Members of Congress who supported overturning the 2020 election, including Ted Cruz, Josh Hawley, Jim Jordan, and Matt Gaetz.

On November 22, 2021, the House Select Committee on the January 6 Attack subpoenaed Stone and Alex Jones for testimony and documents by December 17 and 6, respectively. Stone agreed to appear before the committee, but invoked the Fifth Amendment and refused to answer the committee's questions during a 51 minute period. Stone also sued to prevent a subpoena of his AT&T cell phone metadata by the committee. The committee also revealed ties between Stone and the Proud Boys extremist group.

On December 23, 2021, Stone urged a judge to dismiss a lawsuit filed against him by eight Capitol Police officers, alleging that he is responsible for inciting a crowd of former President Donald Trump's supporters to riot on January 6, 2021. Video evidence later surfaced of him telling Trump supporters on November 2, 2020, that they had "the right to violence."

Federal civil suit
In April 2021, the Justice Department filed a civil suit against Stone and his wife to recover about $2 million in alleged unpaid federal taxes, asserting they had used a commercial entity to shield their income and fund their personal expenses.

Books and other writings
Since 2010, Stone has been an occasional contributor to the conservative website The Daily Caller, serving as a "male fashion editor". Stone also writes for his own fashion blog, Stone on Style.

Stone has written five books, all published by Skyhorse Publishing of New York City. His books have been described as "hatchet jobs" by the Miami Herald and Tampa Bay Times.
 The Man Who Killed Kennedy: The Case Against LBJ (with Mike Colapietro contributing) (Skyhorse Publishing, 2013): Stone contends that Lyndon B. Johnson was behind a conspiracy to kill John F. Kennedy and was complicit in at least six other murders. In a review for The Washington Times, Hugh Aynesworth wrote: "The title pretty much explains the book's theory. If a reader doesn't let facts get in the way, it could be an interesting adventure." Aynesworth, who covered the assassination for the Dallas Morning News, said that the book "is totally full of all kinds of crap".
 Nixon's Secrets: The Rise, Fall and Untold Truth about the President, Watergate, and the Pardon (Skyhorse Publishing, 2014): Stone discusses Richard Nixon and his career. About two-thirds of the book "is a conventional biography that is by no means a whitewash of Nixon. Stone writes that the President took campaign money from the mob, had a long-running affair with a Hong Kong woman who may have been a Chinese spy, and even once unwittingly smuggled three pounds of marijuana into the United States when carrying the suitcase of jazz great Louis Armstrong." The remaining one-third of the book is an unconventional account of the Watergate scandal. Stone portrays Nixon as a "confused victim" and claims that John Dean orchestrated the break-in (which he depicts as ordinary politics of the time) to cover up involvement in a prostitution ring. This account is rejected by experts, such as Watergate researchers Anthony Summers and Max Holland. Holland said of Stone: "He's out of his ever-lovin' mind." Dean said in 2014 that Stone's book and his defense of Nixon are "typical of the alternative universe out there" and "pure bullshit".
 The Clintons' War on Women (with Robert Morrow of Austin, Texas) (Skyhorse Publishing, 2015): This book, according to Politico, is a "sensational" work that contains "explosive, but highly dubious, revelations about both Bill Clinton and Hillary Clinton", with a focus on Bill Clinton sexual misconduct allegations, and a claim that Webster Hubbell is the biological father of Chelsea Clinton. This book was promoted by Trump, who posted a Twitter message containing the book's Amazon.com page. David Corn, writing in Mother Jones, writes that the book is "apparently designed to smear the Clintons – by depicting Bill as a serial rapist, Hillary as an enabler, and both members of the power couple as a diabolical duo bent on destroying anyone who stands in their way" and said that the book was part of a wider "extreme anti-Clinton project" by Stone.
 Jeb! and the Bush Crime Family (with Saint John Hunt) (Skyhorse Publishing, 2016): The book focuses on Jeb Bush and the Bush family.
 The Making of the President 2016: How Donald Trump Orchestrated a Revolution (Skyhorse Publishing, 2017): Susan J. McWilliams, Professor of Politics at Pomona College, wrote in her review of the book that "[a]side from some minor revelations about how long Trump planned what would later appear to be spontaneous decisions he trademarked the slogan "Make America Great Again" in 2013 there's very little Trump, doing very little orchestrating, in these pages" and that "[t]here are many provocative political musings here, but they get lost in Stone's avaricious appetite for self-promotion and grudge-holding."
 Stone's Rules: How to Win at Politics, Business, and Style (Skyhorse Publishing, 2018)
 The Myth of Russian Collusion: The Inside Story of How Donald Trump REALLY Won (Skyhorse Publishing, 2019) (paperback edition of Stone's 2016 book The Making of the President 2016 with an added "Introduction 2019")

Personal style and habits
Stone's personal style has been described as flamboyant. In a 2007 Weekly Standard profile written by Matt Labash, Stone was described as a "lord of mischief" and the "boastful black prince of Republican sleaze". Labash wrote that Stone "often sets his pronouncements off with the utterance 'Stone's Rules,' signifying to listeners that one of his shot-glass commandments is coming down, a pithy dictate uttered with the unbending certitude one usually associates with the Book of Deuteronomy." Examples of Stone's Rules include "Politics with me isn't theater. It's performance art, sometimes for its own sake."

Stone does not wear socksa fact that Nancy Reagan brought to her husband's attention during his 1980 presidential campaign. Labash described him as "a dandy by disposition who boasts of having not bought off-the-rack since he was 17", who has "taught reporters how to achieve perfect double-dimples underneath their tie knots". Washington journalist Victor Gold has noted Stone's reputation as one of the "smartest dressers" in Washington. Stone's longtime tailor is Alan Flusser. Stone dislikes single-vent jackets (describing them as the sign of a "heathen"), saying he owns 100 silver-colored neckties and has 100 suits in storage. Fashion stories have been written about him in GQ and Penthouse. Stone has written of his dislike for jeans and ascots and has praised seersucker three-piece suits, as well as Madras jackets in the summertime and velvet blazers in the winter.

In 1999, Stone credited his facial appearance to "decades of following a regimen of Chinese herbs, breathing therapies, tai chi and acupuncture." Stone wears a diamond pinky ring in the shape of a horseshoe and in 2007 he had Richard Nixon's face tattooed on his back. He has said: "I like English tailoring, I like Italian shoes. I like French wine. I like vodka martinis with an olive, please. I like to keep physically fit." Stone's office in Florida has been described as a "Hall of Nixonia" with framed pictures, posters, bongs, and letters associated with Nixon.

See also
 Criminal charges brought in the Mueller special counsel investigation
 Links between Trump associates and Russian officials
 List of people granted executive clemency by Donald Trump
 Timeline of Russian interference in the 2016 United States elections

Notes

References

External links

 
 
 

1952 births
Living people
21st-century American criminals
1972 United States presidential election
American conspiracy theorists
American lobbyists
American people of Hungarian descent
American people of Italian descent
American political consultants
Donald Trump 2016 presidential campaign
Florida Libertarians
George Washington University alumni
InfoWars people
John F. Kennedy conspiracy theorists
John Jay High School (Cross River, New York) alumni
Members of the Committee for the Re-Election of the President
Members of the Libertarian Party (United States)
New York (state) Libertarians
New York (state) Republicans
People associated with Russian interference in the 2016 United States elections
People associated with the 2016 United States presidential election
People convicted of making false statements
People convicted of obstruction of justice
Protesters in or near the January 6 United States Capitol attack
People from Lewisboro, New York
People from Norwalk, Connecticut
Recipients of American presidential clemency
Recipients of American presidential pardons
Researchers of the assassination of John F. Kennedy
Watergate scandal